IEEE 802.11c is an amendment to the IEEE 802.1D MAC bridging standard to incorporate bridging in wireless bridges or access points.  This work is now part of IEEE 802.1D-2004.

802.11c was ratified in October 1998 and is a supplement to IEEE 802.1D that adds requirements associated with bridging 802.11 wireless client devices. In particular it adds a sub clause under 2.5 Support of the Internal Sublayer Service, to cover bridge operations with 802.11 MACs.

See also

IEEE 802.11
Network bridge
Spanning tree protocol
Wi-Fi

External links
802.1D-2004 MAC Bridges Standard
A quick guide to 802.11 WG and Activities

C

cs:IEEE 802.11c